Tongariki Island is an inhabited island in Shefa Province of Vanuatu in the Pacific Ocean. The island is a part of Shepherd Islands archipelago.

Geography
Tongariki is a small island of volcanic origin located in the eastern Shepherd Islands, having no beaches or reefs. Several small islands lie close to the south coast. The island is 3.8 km long and 1.7 km wide. The estimated terrain elevation above the sea level is some 20 metres. The uninhabited island of Falea lies 1.8 km north-west of Tongariki.The island consist of five villages known as Tavia, Lewaima, Lakilia , mu-ura and Erata.

Population
As of 2015, the official local population was 274 people in 55 households. The main village is Erata. Some local people speak Namakura language.

References

Islands of Vanuatu
Shefa Province